Rogelio Hernández (born 14 April 1934) is a Spanish racing cyclist. He rode in the 1963 Tour de France.

References

External links
 

1934 births
Living people
Spanish male cyclists
Place of birth missing (living people)
Cyclists from Cantabria
People from the Bay of Santander